The 1997–98 season was Villarreal Club de Fútbol's 75th season in existence and the club's 6th consecutive season in the second division of Spanish football. In addition to the domestic league, Villarreal participated in this season's edition of the Copa del Rey. The season covered the period from 1 July 1997 to 30 June 1998.

Competitions

Overall record

Segunda División

League table

Results summary

Results by round

Matches

Promotion play-offs

Copa del Rey

First round

References

Villarreal CF seasons
Villarreal